Moffett-Ralston House, also known as the John C. Robinson House, is a historic home located in Lafayette Township, Owen County, Indiana.  It was built in 1864, and expanded and modified about 1870.  It is a two-story, vernacular Greek Revival / Italian Villa style frame dwelling.  It has a hipped roof with brackets and a rebuilt ornate porch with balustrade.  It was renovated in the early-1970s. It was a boyhood home of Governor and Senator Samuel M. Ralston.

It was listed on the National Register of Historic Places in 1975.

References

Houses on the National Register of Historic Places in Indiana
Greek Revival houses in Indiana
Italianate architecture in Indiana
Houses completed in 1870
Buildings and structures in Owen County, Indiana
National Register of Historic Places in Owen County, Indiana